The Cuban Democratic Socialist Current (Corriente Socialista Democrática Cubana) is a Cuban social democratic party that seeks to "be critical [of] our historical process hegemony within [the] civil society debate of ideas, intents and purposes over the interests and diversity of proposals, what contributes to its richness, within a single space for the nation and society at a time."

They consider that "1959 freezes the social debate. The Cuban Revolution with its attendant double expectations and frustration seized the anxious questions and monopolized all possible answers to the needs of cultural activity, political and social," and want to return to the rational basis of the discussion of ideas.

See also
List of political parties in Cuba

External links
 

Opposition to Fidel Castro
Political parties in Cuba
Socialist parties in Cuba